Elections to Colchester Borough Council took place on 5 May 2022. Eighteen members of the council (one-third of the whole) were elected: one from 16 of the 17 wards, and two councillors from New Town & Christ Church ward, following the death of incumbent councillor Nick Cope (Liberal Democrat), elected in 2019 and due to serve until 2023.

At the election, the Conservative–Independent coalition lost control of the council, with the Conservatives losing seats to the Liberal Democrats and the Green Party. Paul Dundas, the leader of the council, lost his seat in Stanway to challenger Tracey Arnold.

Labour gained one seat from the Liberal Democrats and won the vacated Independent seat in Highwoods, giving them their largest share of representation on the council since the 1990s.

Background

Following the results of the previous election, the ruling "Progressive Alliance" coalition (comprising the Liberal Democrats, Labour and Independents) lost control of the council after the Independents decided to form an administration with the Conservatives, giving them a majority of one seat over the opposition parties.

Summary

Candidates by party

Election results

Incumbents

Aftermath

On 17 May 2022, it was announced that a three-party administration between the Liberal Democrats, Labour and the Green Party would be formed to run the council throughout the 2022-2023 term. This gave the new administration a majority of 12 seats over the now-opposition Conservatives.

David King (Liberal Democrats, Mile End) was elected Leader of the Council, with Adam Fox (Labour Co-op, Old Heath & The Hythe) elected as the Deputy Leader.

Cabinet composition

Following coalition negotiations, a cabinet was formed that consisted of four Liberal Democrats, three Labour, and one Green Party member.

Ward results

The Statement of Persons Nominated was released on 5 April 2022, detailing the candidates who will be standing in each of the wards. The results of the Borough Council election were announced on 6 May 2022.

Incumbents are listed with an asterisk *

Berechurch

Castle

Greenstead

 

 
 

 

No Reform UK (2.7%) candidate as previous.

Highwoods

 

 

 

No Independent (35.0%), Green (6.4%) or Reform UK (2.9%) candidates as previous.

Lexden & Braiswick

Marks Tey & Layer

 
 
 

 

No Independent (4.7%) candidate as previous.

Mersea & Pyefleet

 
 

 

No Green (16.1%) candidate as previous.

Mile End

New Town & Christ Church

Old Heath & The Hythe

Prettygate

Rural North

 
 
 

 

No Reform UK (2.5%) candidate as previous.

Shrub End

 

 

 

No Green (6.1%) or Reform UK (2.8%) candidates as previous.

St. Anne's & St. John's

 

 

 

No Green (6.8%) candidate as previous.

Stanway

 

 

 

No Green (4.4%) candidate as previous.

Tiptree

Wivenhoe

By-elections

Lexden & Braiswick

 
 

 

No Green candidate (11.1%) as previous.

Highwoods

On 20 October 2022, it was announced that Cllr Gerard Oxford and Cllr Beverley Oxford, the two remaining Independent councillors for Highwoods ward, would be resigning from their roles with immediate effect. A by-election was held on 8 December 2022 to fill their vacant seats and was won by one Labour and one Liberal Democrat candidate respectively.

References

Colchester
Colchester Borough Council elections
2020s in Essex